Bodhendra Saraswathi was a 17th-century Hindu pontiff and the 59th Jagathguru (head) of the Kanchi matha, Kanchipuram, Tamil Nadu, India. He spent his later life in Govindapuram.

Early life
Bodhendra was born to Kesavapanduranga Yogi and Suguna in the beginning of 17th century (in the year 1610)at Kanchipuram, which was then headquarters of Kanchi matha.  The couple did not have children for a long time and believed that they were blessed by the devotion to Viswakendra Saraswati(Athmabodhar), the 58th Jagathguru of the Kanchi Matha.  The child was named Purushotaman by Viswakendra Saraswati.

Seeing the extraordinary qualities and immense potentialities of the child, to render incalculable good to humanity, Sri Viswakendra Saraswati requested his parents to hand over the child to the Kanchi Matha with the pious hope of making the child succeed him.  The parents willingly gave the child to the mutt.  The child attained extra ordinary mastery over Sruti and the Smriti.  It gradually dawned on him that nama sankeerthanam (chanting of Lord Rama's name) would fetter the cycles of death and birth in Kali Yuga. He chanted Rama nama (the name of Lord Rama) one lakh times every day.

Initiation of Sainthood
Athmabodhar instructed Bodhendra Saraswati to proceed to Kanchipuram after obtaining Lakshmi Sreedhar's Bhagawan Nama Koumundhi from the author himself at Jagannatha Kshetram (Puri), and to compose a lakh of Bhagawan Nama slokas (sacred texts on lord) on the basis of Bhagawan Nama Koumundhi. The above-mentioned mandate of his guru (teacher) gave him a golden opportunity to pour out his devotion to Lord Rama and to vindicate the efficacy of Rama Nama (name of Lord Rama).

At Lakshmi Sreedhar's residence in Jagannath, a young couple were waiting to see Lakshmi Sreedhar. The husband recounted his unfortunate plight: He and his wife had embarked on a pilgrimage to Kasi, when his wife was abducted by a group of Muslims. Heart broken, he had continued to complete his pilgrimage and while returning, was taking bath at a river bank. A little distance away a group of Muslim ladies were bathing, and one of them, on perceiving him, dissociated herself from the group and ran towards him and urged him, "Dear husband let us run away and escape".Both had retired to safety, and come hither to receive instructions as to what to do further, since it was not proper to receive the spouse without undergoing a prayaschiitam (atonement). Lakshmi Sreedhar submitted that chanting Sri Rama Nama would suffice. Bodhendral asked Sreedhar for evidence. Lakshmi Sreedhar pointed out the section from "Bhagwaan Nama Koumudhi". Bodendral decided to prove the veracity of this statement and accompanied the couple to the Pushkarani (Holy water tank). At His instance, the abducted girl dipped into the waters in her muslim garb and surfaced, with Hindu attire and a bindhi on her forehead. This miracle occurred consequent to the divinity inherent in Bodendral. Following this incident at Jagannath, He was named Bhagawan Nama Bodendral.

Govindapuram
Bodhendra Saraswathi, during the course of his wanderings in the Cauvery delta was attracted by the beauty of the place and decided to attain samadhi or salvation at the spot. One morning, in the Purattasi (September–October) month of the year 1692, Bodhendra Saraswathi attained Jeeva Samadhi sitting in a yogic state. He attained Videha Mukthi at Govindapuram on Full Moon day in the month of Proshtapada of the cyclic year Prajotpatti (1692 AD).  The Samadhi of Bodhendra Saraswathi is maintained by the Kanchi matha.

References

Indian Hindu monks
Shankaracharyas
17th-century Indian scholars
1692 deaths
Year of birth unknown
17th-century Hindu religious leaders
Scholars from Tamil Nadu
People from Kanchipuram district
1610 births